Odd Solli (8 August 1924 – 29 March 2007) was a Norwegian bobsledder. He was born in Stabekk. He competed at the 1956 Winter Olympics in Cortina d'Ampezzo, where he placed 20th in men's two, together with Arne Røgden, and 11th in men's four.

References

External links

1924 births
2007 deaths
Sportspeople from Bærum
Norwegian male bobsledders
Olympic bobsledders of Norway
Bobsledders at the 1956 Winter Olympics